Year 1411 (MCDXI) was a common year starting on Thursday (link will display the full calendar) of the Julian calendar.

Events 
 January–December 
 February 1 – The First Peace of Thorn is signed at Thorn in the Monastic State of the Teutonic Knights, ending the Polish–Lithuanian–Teutonic War.
 February 17 – Ottoman Interregnum: Süleyman Çelebi is killed after being forced to flee his capital, Edirne, by his brother Musa Çelebi. Rule of the Ottoman domains in Europe (Rumelia) passes to Musa.
 July 6 – Ming Dynasty Admiral Zheng He returns to Nanjing after his second voyage, and presents the Sinhalese king, captured during the Ming–Kotte War, to the Yongle Emperor.
 July 24 – Battle of Harlaw in Scotland: Domhnall of Islay, Lord of the Isles, and an army commanded by Alexander Stewart, Earl of Mar battle to a bloody draw.
 September 3 – The Treaty of Selymbria is concluded between the Ottoman Empire and the Republic of Venice.
 September 21 – King Henry IV of England calls his ninth parliament.
 November 30 – Henry IV dismisses Prince Henry and his supporters from the government.

 Date unknown 
 Under the Yongle Emperor of Ming China, work begins to reinstate the ancient Grand Canal of China, which fell into disuse and dilapidation during the previous Yuan dynasty. Between 1411 and 1415, a total of 165,000 laborers dredge the canal bed in Shandong, build new channels, embankments, and canal locks. Four large reservoirs in Shandong are also dug, in order to regulate water levels, instead of resorting to pumping water from local tables. A large dam is also constructed, to divert water from the Wen River southwest into the Grand Canal.
 Constantinople is briefly besieged by the Ottoman pretender Musa Çelebi, due to Byzantine support for Süleyman Çelebi during the Ottoman Interregnum.
 (possibly early 1412) The Battle of İnceğiz between the rival brothers Mehmed Çelebi and Musa Çelebi, during the Ottoman Interregnum.

Births 
 September 21 – Richard of York, 3rd Duke of York, claimant to the English throne (d. 1460)
 date unknown –  Juan de Mena, Spanish poet (d. 1456)
 Margareta of Celje, Polish Duchess (d. 1480)

Deaths 
 January 18 – Jobst of Moravia, ruler of Moravia, King of the Romans
 February 6 – Esau de' Buondelmonti, ruler of Epirus 
 June 3 –Leopold IV, Duke of Austria (b. 1371)
 September – Anne de Mortimer, Countess of Cambridge (b. 1390)
 November 4 – Khalil Sultan, ruler of Transoxiana (b. 1384)
 probable – Hasdai Crescas, Jewish philosopher

References